The South Yemeni Football League or the People's Democratic Republic of Yemen Football League was an association football league held for domestic football clubs in South Yemen held between 1970 and 1990. The league was folded when South and North Yemen unified as one country (Yemen) on 22 May 1990. This resulted in the creation of the Yemeni League.

Al-Tilal have a record six South Yemen league titles, making them the most successful out of this competition. The domestic cup was the South Yemen Cup.

Title winners 

 1970/71 -                       Al-Tilal

 1975/76 -                       Al-Wahda

 1976/77 -                       Al-Tilal

 1979/80 - Al-Tilal
 1981/82 - Al-Tilal
 1982/83 - Al-Tilal
 1983/84 - Al-Shorta
 1986/87 - Al-Tilal
 1987/88 - Al-Wahda
 1988/89 - Al-Wahda
 1989/90 - Al-Shula

References 

 

1970 in Yemen
Football leagues in Yemen
Defunct top level football leagues in Asia